Corporated-class of sullage barges are series of seven yardcrafts being built by M/s Corporated Shipyard Private Limited, Kolkata for the Indian navy.

Description
The barges have a designed capacity to carry 300 tonnes of oil in 6 equal size tanks. Their steel cutting was started on 21 October 2009 and keel laying of 4 Barges was done on 30 October 2009. They have been certified and classed by Indian Register of shipping. The barges will be in service of the Western Naval Command's bases at Karwar and Mumbai.
As of December 2012, construction of 4 barges have been completed. The SB-II barge however met an accident with Pamban railway bridge on 13 January 2013 while being delivered to the navy's Western Command.

Ships in the class

Specification
Gross weight: 220 tonnes
Net weight:66 tonnes
Dead weight:302.8 tonnes
Displacement:468 tonnes
Light weight:165 tonnes
Overall length: 31.5 meters
LBP: 29.9 meters
Brdth:	7.9 meters
Draught (max):	2.75 meters
Depth Mld: 3.6	meters

References

External links
http://newindianexpress.com/states/tamil_nadu/article1423522.ece
http://www.thehindu.com/news/states/tamil-nadu/barge-crashes-into-pamban-rail-bridge/article4305049.ece

Auxiliary ships of the Indian Navy
Ships of the Indian Navy
Auxiliary barge classes